Lázaro Cárdenas is a city in San Quintín Municipality, Baja California, located on the Pacific Coast of Mexico. With a population of 16,294 and is the largest population center in the entire municipality, far surpassing the population of the locality of San Quintín itself (with a population of about 5,000).

References 
 https://web.archive.org/web/20140201225633/http://sanquintin.com.mx/poblados/lazaro-cardenas/ [Spanish]

Baja California
Cities in San Quintín Municipality